Rangsiya Nisaisom (born June 11, 1994) is a Thai taekwondo practitioner. She won a gold medal in the women's 62 kg class at the 2011 World Taekwondo Championships in Gyeongju, South Korea.

References

 Guangzhou 2010 profile

External links
 
 

Rangsiya Nisaisom
1994 births
Living people
Taekwondo practitioners at the 2012 Summer Olympics
Rangsiya Nisaisom
Taekwondo practitioners at the 2010 Asian Games
Taekwondo practitioners at the 2014 Asian Games
Asian Games medalists in taekwondo
Rangsiya Nisaisom
Medalists at the 2014 Asian Games
Universiade medalists in taekwondo
Universiade bronze medalists for Thailand
World Taekwondo Championships medalists
Medalists at the 2015 Summer Universiade
Rangsiya Nisaisom